The American Constitution Party (ACN) is one of the state of Colorado's political parties. It is affiliated with the national-level Constitution Party, a conservative political party in the United States that says it bases most of its policy positions on the Constitution. The party asserts that the US is a Christian nation founded on the Bible and that American jurisprudence should be restored to what the party claims is its "Biblical foundations". The ACN qualified for major party status in Colorado after receiving more than 36% of the vote in the 2010 gubernatorial election. As the party did not field a candidate in the 2014 election, it reverted to minor party status.

Background

The American Constitution Party registered as a political party with the state of Colorado on July 23, 2000. In July 2013, the ACN had just over 7,000 registered Colorado voters affiliated with it. Some of the party's positions include:

ACN members ... call for the abolition of the Food and Drug Administration, the Internal Revenue Service, the departments of Education and Energy and the Federal Election Commission. They seek the repeal of a number of laws, including one aimed at preventing threats and force against abortion clinics and women seeking abortions and a 1960s-era law meant to end discriminatory election practices.

For most of its existence, the ACN has existed as one of Colorado's "minor parties", and has never elected one of its candidates to office.

Party platform

The American Constitution Party of Colorado seeks to:

 Allow state legislatures, not voters, to pick U.S. senators (i.e., repeal the 17th Amendment)
 Repeal legislation making it illegal to use force or the threat of force to interfere with a woman seeking an abortion
 Abolish congressional pensions
 End the Endangered Species Act
 Terminate the U.S. Departments of Energy and Education, the Food and Drug Administration, the Federal Election Commission and the Internal Revenue Service
 Ban electronic voting to prevent voter fraud
 Repeal all federal campaign-finance laws
 Repeal the Voting Rights Act of 1965
 End compulsory public school attendance and promote homeschooling, private schools or religious schools
 End any domestic federal aid not provided for in the U.S. Constitution, as it is "not only illegal, it is immoral"
 End foreign aid and participation in multinational groups, such as the United Nations, as well as multinational treaties
 Retake the Panama Canal for the United States
 Prevent women from serving in combat as "these 'advances' undermine the integrity, morale and performance of our military organizations"
 "Cease financing or arming of belligerents in the world's troubled areas"
 Return to the people all federal lands held by the government without constitutional authorization
 Revoke the legalization of the union of gay couples in either marriages or civil unions
 Immediately collect all foreign debts owed to the U.S.

The ACN is affiliated with the national-level Constitution Party, which has developed a party platform as well.

2010 gubernatorial election; qualifying as 'major party' 

Former Republican Congressman Tom Tancredo ran as the party's candidate for Colorado governor in 2010 after the campaign of Republican Party nominee Dan Maes collapsed politically. He won around 36% of the vote, receiving more than 2.5 times the vote of Republican Party nominee Maes. Democratic candidate John Hickenlooper won the election with just over 51% of the vote.

Context and aftermath 
Under state law, the American Constitution Party's vote share in the 2010 gubernatorial election elevated the party from "minor" to "major" party status. Any party that earns 10% or more of the votes cast for governor is a defined under statute as a "major party". Major party status gives the party a place at or near the top of the ballot in the 2014 gubernatorial election.

However, because of the additional organizational, financial, and compliance requirements triggered by major party status, ACN leaders were ambivalent about the change.

After the election, Tancredo quickly rejoined the Republican Party, disappointing an ACN leadership struggling to contend with major party status and how to successfully leverage the increased attention the party had received because of his candidacy.

The party effectively relinquished its 'major party' status by the 2014 gubernatorial election, by virtue of not running or fielding a candidate.

Recent electoral history 

Although the American Constitution Party's political and organizational sophistication did not grow despite the attention brought to it by Tancredo's 2010 gubernatorial candidacy, the party fielded more candidates in the 2010 and 2012 cycles than it had in the entirety of the previous decade.

In the 2022 elections, the party fielded candidates in races for US House, in Districts 2, 4 and 5, as well as in statewide elections for Governor, Lieutenant Governor, Secretary of State, and in District 8 for the Board of Education. All were unsuccessful, recording less than 1% of the vote in most of these races.

See also
Politics of Colorado
Electoral history of the Constitution Party
List of state Constitution Parties

References

External links
 American Constitution Party (Colorado)
 Constitution Party 2012 National Platform
The Castle Report - News and Commentary from a Constitutionist Perspective
National Veterans Coalition
Home Front with Cynthia Davis - Taking Back America One Family at A Time
American Constitution Party of Colorado at Ballotpedia

Colorado
Political parties in Colorado
Political parties established in 2000
State and local conservative parties in the United States